A Boston round bottle, or Winchester bottle,  is a strong, heavy bottle commonly used in the drug and chemical industries.  It is often made of amber (brown) glass (to filter out UV light) but can also be  made of plastics.

History
At the time, a system of dry capacity measures known as "Winchester" was still in use. The Winchester bushel is still used in the US. However, the Winchester quart bottle has no relation whatsoever to any other units called "Winchester". In the 20th century, the Winchester Quart was metricated to two and a half litres.

Construction
A "Boston round" has a cylindrical shape without a handle and a short curved shoulder.  It is threaded for closing with a screw cap.

See also
Glass bottle
 List of bottle types, brands and companies
Plastic bottle
Reagent bottle

References

Books, general references
 Soroka, W, "Fundamentals of Packaging Technology", IoPP, 2002, 
 Yam, K. L., "Encyclopedia of Packaging Technology", John Wiley & Sons, 2009, 
 Wilde, Edith E., "Weights and measures of the city of Winchester", The Club, 1931
 Connor, R. D., "The Weights and Measures of England", H.M.S.O., 1987, 

Laboratory glassware
Glass bottles